Railway stations in Egypt include:

Stations served by passenger trains

Stations served

Existing 

Most major lines originate from Ramses Station, Cairo or Misr Station, Alexandria: 
 Giza
 Luxor
 Edfu
 Aswan
 Shellal
 Port Said
 Suez
 Damietta
 El Alamein
 Marsa Matruh

Proposed
 In 2010, a road/rail tunnel under the Suez canal was proposed.
 In 2014, the following 80 km long double track 25 kV line was proposed:
 El Salem
 Bilbeis City
 Sharqeya

Possible
 Hurghada (Red sea)
 Safaga
 to Luxor

 Sadat City
 Cairo

 Aswan
 Marsa Alam

Ferry
A weekly ferry service on the Nile River connects the Egyptian railhead at Aswan with the Sudan railhead at Wadi Halfa.

See also
 Egyptian National Railways
 Egypt-Sudan Railway Committee

References

External links
 Upgrade

 
Railway stations
Egypt